Christian Hadinata (born 11 December 1949) is a former Chinese Indonesian badminton player.

Profile 
Though early in his career he was a fine singles player who reached the final of the prestigious All-England Championship in 1973, Christian's success in doubles earned him recognition as one of the great doubles players in badminton history. He won two gold medals at the 1980 IBF World Championships in Jakarta, in men's doubles with Ade Chandra, and in mixed doubles with Imelda Wiguna. He played for Indonesia for 15 years, beginning his career in 1971 at the Asian championships in Indonesia and managed to become a mixed doubles champion with Retno Koestijah. Christian's Thomas Cup (Men's International Team Championship) record is particularly notable. Playing in six consecutive campaigns from 1973 to 1986, and with a variety of doubles partners, he dropped only one match, thus helping Indonesia to capture the cup on four occasions (1973, 1976, 1979, 1984). In 2001 he was inducted into the World Badminton Hall of Fame.

Personal life 
His wife is Yoke Anwar and they have two children. People affectionately call him Ko Ko Chris (Ko Ko meaning big brother in Hokkien).

Career Coach 
 Indonesian badminton player (1971–1986)
 Indonesian badminton coach (began in 1985)
 Director National Training PBSI (Indonesia Badminton Association)

Awards and nominations

Achievements

Olympic Games (demonstration) 
Men's doubles

Mixed doubles

World Games 
Mixed doubles

World Championships 
Men's doubles

Mixed doubles

World Cup 
Men's doubles

Mixed doubles

Asian Games 
Men's doubles

Mixed doubles

Asian Championships 
Men's doubles

Mixed doubles

Southeast Asian Games 
Men's doubles

Mixed doubles

International Open Tournaments (16 titles, 17 runners-up)

The World Badminton Grand Prix has been sanctioned by the International Badminton Federation from 1983 to 2006.

Men's singles

Men's doubles

Mixed doubles

 IBF Grand Prix tournament
 IBF Grand Prix Finals tournament

Invitational Tournaments 

Men's doubles

Mixed doubles

References

External links 
 Profile (In Indonesian)
 Christian Hadinata Paling Rajin, Pangkat Naik, Enggan di Belakang Meja 
 Christian Hadinata Jual Rumah demi Pendidikan Anak 
 Christian Hadinata Kesetiaan di Dunia Bulutangkis 
 BadmintonOnline.com: Christian Hadinata 
 Smash - Christian Hadinata
 
 

1949 births
Living people
Indonesian male badminton players
Olympic badminton players of Indonesia
Badminton players at the 1972 Summer Olympics
World Games medalists in badminton
World Games bronze medalists
Competitors at the 1981 World Games
Asian Games medalists in badminton
Asian Games gold medalists for Indonesia
Asian Games silver medalists for Indonesia
Asian Games bronze medalists for Indonesia
Badminton players at the 1974 Asian Games
Badminton players at the 1978 Asian Games
Badminton players at the 1982 Asian Games
Badminton players at the 1986 Asian Games
Medalists at the 1974 Asian Games
Medalists at the 1978 Asian Games
Medalists at the 1982 Asian Games
Medalists at the 1986 Asian Games
Southeast Asian Games medalists in badminton
Southeast Asian Games gold medalists for Indonesia
Southeast Asian Games silver medalists for Indonesia
Southeast Asian Games bronze medalists for Indonesia
Competitors at the 1977 Southeast Asian Games
Competitors at the 1979 Southeast Asian Games
Competitors at the 1983 Southeast Asian Games
Competitors at the 1985 Southeast Asian Games
Badminton coaches
People from Banyumas Regency
Indonesian sportspeople of Chinese descent
Indonesian Christians